Velin Kefalov (born 18 September 1968) is a Bulgarian football defender and currently manager.

Career
He was born in Kazanlak and started his career with the local team Etar Veliko Tarnovo. In 1997, he signed a contract for one year with the team from Ukrainian Premier League Vorskla Poltava. In 1998 Kefalov returned to Bulgaria – to Etar Veliko Tarnovo.

Managerial career
After completing his playing career Kefalov began a coaching job. At the beginning of the twenty-first century, Kefalov led Etar 1924, and then became director of the Football School in Veliko Tarnovo. In the summer of 2009, he moved, at the invitation of coach Angel Chervenkov, to work as his assistant in Litex. His excellent training led the club to win the championship. In August 2010, Kefalov again took the position of head coach with Etar Veliko Tarnovo.

External links
 

1968 births
Living people
Bulgarian footballers
Bulgarian expatriate footballers
Bulgarian football managers
Association football defenders
FC Etar Veliko Tarnovo players
PFC Spartak Pleven players
FC Vorskla Poltava players
First Professional Football League (Bulgaria) players
Ukrainian Premier League players
Expatriate footballers in Ukraine
People from Kazanlak